Zvezdan Mitrović (born 19 February 1970) is a Montenegrin professional basketball coach.

Coaching career

Ukrainian League (2002–2014) 
During twelve years in the Ukrainian Basketball SuperLeague, Mitrović coached Khimik, Krivbasbasket, Budivelnyk Kyiv and Azovmash Mariupol.

Monaco (2015–2018) 
As a new head coach, Mitrović joined AS Monaco in March 2015. He won the LNB Pro B league championship (French 2nd-tier league) in the 2014–15 season. AS Monaco was promoted to the LNB Pro A (French 1st-tier league) for the 2015–16 season. At the end of the season, he finished 2nd in the Best Coach of the Year voting.

In the 2015–16 season, his team finished first place in the regular season, and lost against ASVEL in the league's playoff semifinals. Mitrović was selected as the head coach of the International Team of the 2016 French All-Star Game. In the 2017–18 season, Mitrović led Monaco to the championship game of the Basketball Champions League, where the club lost to AEK Athens. On 16 May 2018, he was named the French Pro A League's Best Coach, for the second consecutive season.

ASVEL (2018–2020) 
On June 26, 2018, Mitrović signed a three-year contract with ASVEL Basket. In the 2018–19 season, he guided the team to the French national championship title and to winning the French Cup. He was sacked by ASVEL in May 2020 and contested the decision of the club.

Monaco (2020–2021) 
On July 2nd, 2020, he returned to AS Monaco. He parted ways with the club on December 13, 2021.

National team coaching career
Mitrović was an assistant coach for the senior Montenegro men's national team at the EuroBasket 2013, under head coach Luka Pavićević.

On October 6, 2017, Mitrović was named the head coach of Montenegro senior men's national team.

Coaching record

EuroCup

|- 
|- ! style="background:#FDE910;"
| align="left" rowspan=1|AS Monaco
| align="left"|2020-21
| 22|| 16 || 6 ||  || align="center"|  Won EuroCup Championship

EuroLeague

|- 
| align="left" rowspan=1|LDLC ASVEL Villeurbanne
| align="left"|2019–20
| 25 || 10 || 15 ||  || align="center"| Season cancelled due to the Covid-19 Pandemic
|- 
| align="left" rowspan=1|AS Monaco
| align="left"|2020–21
| 14 || 5 || 9 ||  || align="center"| Left his position in December 2021 
|- 
|-class="sortbottom"
| align="center" colspan=2|Career||25||10||15||||

Career achievements and awards 
As a head coach
 French Pro A Leaders Cup winner: 3 (with AS Monaco: 2016, 2017, 2018)
 French Second League champion: 1 (with AS Monaco: 2014–15)
 Ukrainian League champion: 1 (with Krivbasbasket: 2008–09)
 Ukrainian Cup winner: 1 (with Budivelnyk Kyiv: 2011–12)
 Basketball Champions League third place: 1 (with AS Monaco: 2017)
 FIBA EuroCup Challenge runner-up:  1 (with Khimik Yuzhne: 2005–06)
As an assistant coach
 Yugoslav Cup winner: 2 (with Budućnost: 1995–96, 1997–98)
Individual
 French League Coach of the Year: 2017 2018
 Ukrainian League Coach of the Year: 2009

See also 
 List of EuroCup-winning head coaches

References

External links
 Coach Profile at AS Monaco
 Coach Profile at eurobasket.com
 Coach Profile at fibaeurope.com

1970 births
Living people
AS Monaco Basket coaches
ASVEL Basket coaches
Expatriate basketball people in Monaco
KK Budućnost coaches
Montenegrin basketball coaches
Montenegrin expatriate basketball people in France
Montenegrin expatriate sportspeople in Ukraine
Sportspeople from Podgorica